Benjamin Hale Cheever (born October 8, 1948) is an American writer and editor. He is the son of Mary Winternitz and writer John Cheever and brother of Susan Cheever. To date, he has written four adult fiction novels, one children's book, and two nonfiction books.

Works of fiction
The Plagiarist (Simon & Schuster Adult, 1992)
Synopsis—Arthur Prentice is the only child of author Icarus Prentice, a famous novelist. He is in a bad marriage and his son is unhappy. Arthur leaves his job at a newspaper and joins the staff of The American Reader, a "reprint magazine" where the management tries to get Icarus to write for the magazine, but Icarus thinks the magazine is a joke.

The Partisan (Simon & Schuster Adult, 1994)
Was picked as Editor's Choice of The New York Times Best Books in its year.
Synopsis—Nelson is a young film student at New York University. In his life are his 'aunt and uncle,' Jonas Collingwood, author of 18th century spectacularly gloomy novels, and his sister Nar (Narcissus). Nelson and his family live a cloistered life in the suburbs where Nelson dreams of owning his own car, uncle Jonas writing his novels, his aunt burning dinners, and Nar charming men and dreaming of owning a horse.

Famous After Death (Bloomsbury USA, 2000)
Synopsis—In 1984, Noel Hammersmith, a chubby 30-something year old, gets dumped by his girlfriend. His dream is to be tall, skinny and famous. He wants to be famous to the point where he thinks he might have to kill someone.

The Good Nanny (Bloomsbury USA, 2004)
Synopsis—Stuart Cross, an editor at a small publishing house and his wife Andie Wilde, a top film critic for the New York Post bought a new house in the suburbs. They decide to hire a nanny, Louise also known as "Miss Washington" and "Sugar" to the children. Louise is a natural with the children. Nine-year-old Ginny and six-year-old Jane think of Louise as the ideal nanny, but Andie feels differently. Andie feels paranoid about Louise's activities such as her enjoyment of reading Hilaire Belloc, being an accomplished painter and having a best friend who is a nice guy but has a prison history. While Andie feels displaced, Stuart suffers a professional blow and becomes annoyed when he learns about the Museum of Modern Art's interest in Louise's paintings.

The First Dog (2009)
Synopsis—This children's story is about Adam and Eve's dog, the first dog known to humankind. Tim Grajek is the illustrator.

Works of non-fiction
Selling Ben Cheever: Back to Square One in a Service Economy (Bloomsbury USA, 2002)
Synopsis—Benjamin Cheever refers to himself as Ben and writes about the economic struggles of 1995 in the US. He wrote this book after he couldn't sell his latest work of fiction and started to think about other jobs he could have had.

Strides: Running Through History With an Unlikely Athlete (Rodale Books; 1st edition, 2007)
Synopsis—Cheever discovered running at the age of 28 during 1977 while working at the Reader's Digest. During this time, Cheever was going through an unhappy marriage and became involved with marathon running as a result. The book also covers past history of the sport.

Works edited
The Letters of John Cheever (Simon & Schuster Adult, 2009)
Synopsis—John Cheever, father of Benjamin Cheever, was a novelist, short-story writer and winner of a Pulitzer Prize and National Book Award. John Cheever wrote letters to famous writers, family, friends, and lovers. He wrote about thirty letters a week which turned out to be thousands. These letters show John Cheever's development as a writer and a man.

Reader's Digest

Personal life
Benjamin lives in Pleasantville, New York.

References

External links
 
 Essay by Ben Cheever

1948 births
Living people
American magazine editors
American book editors
Place of birth missing (living people)
American memoirists
20th-century American novelists
Novelists from New York (state)
People from Pleasantville, New York
21st-century American novelists
American male novelists
20th-century American male writers
21st-century American male writers
20th-century American non-fiction writers
21st-century American non-fiction writers
American male non-fiction writers
Loomis Chaffee School alumni